Roșiești is a commune in Vaslui County, Western Moldavia, Romania. It is composed of seven villages: Codreni, Gara Roșiești, Gura Idrici, Idrici, Rediu, Roșiești and Valea lui Darie.

Natives
Dumitru Bagdasar
Nicolae Bagdasar

References

Communes in Vaslui County
Localities in Western Moldavia